The Leeds municipal elections were held on Saturday 2 November 1946, with one third of the council and vacancies in Burmantofts and Farnley & Wortley to be elected. A handful of wards - Armley & Wortley, Burmantofts, Holbeck North, Hunslet Carr & Middleton and Osmondthorpe - went uncontested.

Rebounding from the heavy defeat the year before, the Conservatives managed a 13% swing to win the popular vote - although that feat went poorly rewarded, as Labour won a comfortable majority of the seats contested and made a net gain to add to their national victory. Elsewhere the Liberal vote was less than half of that the previous year, and the Communists contested this year with three candidates. Turnout seen a slight drop from the prior election to 41.9%.

Election result

The result had the following consequences for the total number of seats on the council after the elections:

Ward results

References

1946 English local elections
1946
1940s in Leeds